MTV Presents: Varna Beach is a music festival organized by MTV Europe, which is part of Viacom Media Networks. The first edition of the event took place on July 15, 2017 on the South Beach in Varna, Bulgaria, and welcomed international performers such as Bebe Rexha, Tinie Tempah, Jonas Blue, Gorgon City and local artists including Poli Genova, Kristian Kostov and Dara.

References

MTV
Music festivals in Bulgaria